Northbourne Avenue is a major road in Canberra, Australia. It extends from City Hill in the south, to the Federal Highway in the north. 

It is a north–south running road which has three lanes for motorised traffic, and one lane for bicycles running in each direction, with a large median strip containing a light railway line between rows of trees. The speed limit is 40 km/h. The Federal Highway to the north of the intersection with Mouat and Antill streets has an 80 km/h speed limit. These speed limits are strictly enforced with multiple fixed red light/speed cameras in the 40 km/h zone and mobile speed cameras being permitted to operate along the entire length of the road.

Northbourne Avenue is the dividing line between the suburbs of Turner and Lyneham on the west, with the suburbs of Braddon, Dickson and Downer on the east.

Many ACTION buses travelling between City and Dickson, Gungahlin or Belconnen used the road, which had many bus stops along it until the light rail line along the median strip opened in April 2019.

Northbourne Avenue was planted with Eucalyptus elata (river peppermint gums) between 1983 and 1986, the third generation of Eucalyptus on the road. The previous generation was Corymbia maculata (spotted gums). The river peppermint gums were cleared for Capital Metro and replanted with Eucalyptus mannifera (brittle gums).

See also

References

External links

Streets in Canberra